Kalinko may refer to: 

Kalinko, Guinea
Kalinko, Poland